Leopold Hammel (August 24, 1858February 26, 1929) was an American lawyer and Democratic politician.  He was a prominent lawyer in Milwaukee for nearly 40 years and served as district attorney of Milwaukee County (1893–1895).  Earlier in his career, he represented Outagamie County in the Wisconsin State Assembly for four years (1885–1889).

Biography

Born in Rochester, New York, Hammel moved to Appleton, Wisconsin, in 1866. In 1877, Hammel graduated from Lawrence University and went to the Columbia Law School. Hammel was admitted to the Wisconsin bar and practiced law in Appleton. In 1885 and 1887, Hammel served in the Wisconsin State Assembly and was a Democrat. Later, Hammel moved to Milwaukee, Wisconsin and continued to practice law. Hammel served as district attorney for Milwaukee County, Wisconsin. Hammel died of a heart attack in Milwaukee, Wisconsin.

Notes

References

External links

1858 births
1929 deaths
Politicians from Rochester, New York
Politicians from Appleton, Wisconsin
Politicians from Milwaukee
Lawrence University alumni
Columbia Law School alumni
Wisconsin lawyers
Lawyers from Rochester, New York
19th-century American lawyers
Jewish American state legislators in Wisconsin
Republican Party members of the Wisconsin State Assembly